Vidyalankara Pirivena is one of the largest Buddhist pirivenas in Sri Lanka. Located in Peliyagoda, it is nearly 150 years old.  Under the pirivena's leadership, several schools were started in the region; one is Sri Dharmaloka College, one of the national schools in the region. Vidyalankara Pirivena was founded on November 1, 1875, by Venerable Ratmalane Sri Dharmaloka Thera.

In 1978, it became the University of Kelaniya.

References

External links 
http://www.vidyalankara.org/

Buddhist universities and colleges
Piriven in Sri Lanka
Buddhism in Sri Lanka
Schools in Colombo District
Archaeological protected monuments in Gampaha District